A Galileo thermometer (or Galilean thermometer) is a thermometer made of a sealed glass cylinder containing a clear liquid and several glass vessels of varying density. The individual floats rise or fall in proportion to their respective density and the density of the surrounding liquid as the temperature changes. It is named after Galileo Galilei because he discovered the principle on which this thermometer is based—that the density of a liquid changes in proportion to its temperature.

History
Although named after the 16th–17th-century physicist Galileo, the thermometer was not invented by him. (Galileo did invent a thermometer called Galileo's air thermometer, more accurately called a thermoscope, in or before 1603.) 

The instrument now known as a Galileo thermometer was invented by a group of academics and technicians known as the Accademia del Cimento of Florence, who included Galileo's pupil, Torricelli and Torricelli's pupil Viviani. Details of the thermometer were published in the Saggi di naturali esperienze fatte nell'Academia del Cimento sotto la protezione del Serenissimo Principe Leopoldo di Toscana e descritte dal segretario di essa Accademia (1666), the Academy's main publication. The English translation of this work (1684) describes the device ('The Fifth Thermometer') as 'slow and lazy', a description that is reflected in an alternative Italian name for the invention, the termometro lento (slow thermometer). The outer vessel was filled with 'rectified spirits of wine' (a concentrated solution of ethanol in water); the weights of the glass bubbles were adjusted by grinding a small amount of glass from the sealed end; and a small air space was left at the top of the main vessel to allow 'for the Liquor to rarefie' (i.e. expand). 

The device now called the Galileo thermometer was revived in the modern era by the Natural History Museum, London, which started selling a version in the 1990s.

Operation
In the Galileo thermometer, the small glass bulbs are partly filled with different-colored liquids. The composition of these liquids is mainly water; some contain a tiny percent of alcohol, but that is not important for the functioning of the thermometer; they merely function as fixed weights, with their colors denoting given temperatures. Once the hand-blown bulbs have been sealed, their effective densities are adjusted using the metal tags hanging from beneath them. Any expansion due to the temperature change of the colored liquid and air gap inside the bulbs does not affect the operation of the thermometer, as these materials are sealed inside a glass bulb of fixed size. The clear liquid in which the bulbs are submerged is not water, but some organic compounds (such as ethanol or kerosene) the density of which varies with temperature more than water does. Temperature changes affect the density of the outer clear liquid and this causes the bulbs to rise or sink accordingly.

Gallery

See also
 Cartesian diver

References

Thermometers
Science education materials